Ahmad Yusof is a Malaysian footballer who plays for Penang and Pahang as a midfielder. He also a football manager.

Career 
With the Malaysia national team, he won the 1989 SEA Games gold medal. He also former national team captain. In February 1999, Asian Football Confederation recognize Ahmad Yusof achievement of representing the country 103 times (match including Olympic qualification, against national 'B' football team, club side and selection side), 92 caps is against full national team. Thus, Asian Football Confederation include him into the AFC Century Club in 1999.

Honours

Club

As player
Penang
 Malaysia League
Winners: 1982

Pahang
 Malaysia League/Division 1/Premier League
Winners: 1987, 1992, 1995
 Malaysia Cup
Winners: 1992
 Malaysia Charity Cup
Winners: 1992, 1993

International 
 SEA Games
Winners: 1989
 Pestabola Merdeka
Winners: 1986, 1993

Individual 
 AFC Century Club 1999

As Manager
Kedah
 Malaysia FA Cup
 Runners-up: 2010

Sime Darby
 Malaysia FAM League
 Winners: 2017

Individual 
National Football Award
Best Coach: Nomination 2010

References

External links
#KL2017 Mercu Emas - Adam Nor Azlin dan Ahmad Yusof [Bola Sepak ] (In Malay)

Living people
Malaysian footballers
Malaysia international footballers
1960 births
Penang F.C. players
Sri Pahang FC players
People from Penang
Malaysian people of Malay descent
Southeast Asian Games silver medalists for Malaysia
Southeast Asian Games bronze medalists for Malaysia
Southeast Asian Games gold medalists for Malaysia
Southeast Asian Games medalists in football
Association football midfielders
Competitors at the 1989 Southeast Asian Games